Ernst Robert Lengyel is an American gynecologic oncologist. Lengyel is the Arthur L. and Lee G. Herbst Professor of Obstetrics and Gynecology at the University of Chicago. Lengyel directs the Ovarian Cancer Research Laboratory, a translational research laboratory focused on understanding ovarian cancer metastasis and on developing and testing new treatments for ovarian cancer. In this role, Lengyel and his research team began to investigate the role of the fallopian tube in ovarian cancer as the cells more closely resemble those in the fallopian tube rather than the ovary.

Early life and education
Lengyel completed his medical degree at the Ludwig Maximilian University of Munich and finished his internship and residency at the University of Munich. He eventually moved to the United States and enrolled at the University of California San Francisco for his medical fellowship.

Career
Upon completing his fellowship program in 2004, Lengyel joined the University of Chicago faculty as a research scientist and clinician. Upon joining the Department of Obstetrics and Gynecology, Lengyel and Hilary Kenny began directing the Ovarian Cancer Research Laboratory. As co-directors, they were the first to culture metastatic ovarian cancer cells in a three-dimensional environment.  In 2008, Lengyel was the recipient of a Burroughs Wellcome Fund Clinical Scientist Award in Translational Research for his project "Development of novel therapeutic and diagnostic strategies for ovarian cancer."

In 2013, Lengyel succeeded Arthur Haney as chair of the Department of Obstetrics and Gynecology. In this role, Lengyel and Kenny won a CBC HTS Award for their project "HTS Using an Organotypic Culture of Ovarian Cancer Metastasis." The aim of the project was to "test whether a 3D culture system developed in Lengyel’s lab to mimic the in vivo tumor microenvironment could be utilized to screen for compounds inhibiting ovarian cancer cells metastatic properties such as adhesion, invasion and proliferation/growth". Later, Lengyel was the first author on a study which developed a new screening tool to speed development of ovarian cancer drugs. His study, published in Nature Communications, was the first to describe a high-throughput screening drug-discovery platform for ovarian cancer that mimics the structural organization and function of human tissue.

As a Professor and Chairman of the Department of Obstetrics and Gynecology, Lengyel and his research team began to investigate the role of the fallopian tube in ovarian cancer as the cells more closely resemble those in the fallopian tube rather than the ovary. They described a new treatment using stroma which could prevent the rapid spread of high-grade serous carcinoma. He also served on the editorial board for the Gynecologic Oncology journal. In 2019, Lengyel and his research team described a new treatment using stroma which could prevent the rapid spread of high-grade serous carcinoma. To reach this conclusion, the researchers profiled the expression of more than 5,000 proteins in both normal and cancerous tissues derived from minute amounts of patient biobank material. They also discovered nicotinamide N-methyltransferase was highly expressed in the stroma surrounding metastatic cancer cells. Following this discovery, Lengyel was the recipient of the Chan Zuckerberg Initiative grant to define every cell type in the female reproductive tract. He was later elected a Member of the National Academy of Medicine for his outstanding scientific and professional achievement in biology, medicine and related fields.

References

External links

Living people
American gynecologists
American oncologists
Ludwig Maximilian University of Munich alumni
Members of the National Academy of Medicine
Academic journal editors
University of Chicago faculty
Year of birth missing (living people)
German emigrants to the United States
American medical researchers